Maier Museum of Art at Randolph College features works by American artists from the 19th through 21st centuries. Randolph College (founded at Randolph-Macon Women's College) has been collecting American art since 1907 and the Maier Museum of Art now houses its collection of several thousand American paintings, prints, drawings, and photographs from the 19th and 21st centuries.

The Maier hosts an active schedule of special exhibitions and education programs throughout the year. Through its programs, internships, museum studies practicums, and class visits, the Maier Museum of Art provides valuable learning opportunities for Randolph students and the community at large.

History 
Randolph-Macon Women's College, founded by William Waugh Smith, was the first women's college in the south. Smith gained support for the college from the River Mont Land Company who donated 20 acres of land in what is now the city Lynchburg, Virginia. Smith raised $100,000 from 150 local residents and founded the College on March 10, 1891, welcoming the first class in 1893 with 36 female students and 12 professors. The art collection was established when the senior class of 1907 commissioned a portrait from William Meritt Chase of William Waugh Smith, the first president of Randolph-Macon Women's College (now Randolph College).

In 1911, Louise Jordan Smith, the college's first professor of art, established an annual exhibition of contemporary art. Since then, the college has purchased at least one work of art the each annual exhibition to add to its collection.

In 2007, Randolph–Macon Women's College became co-ed and was renamed Randolph College.

Annual Exhibition of Contemporary Art 
An early champion of American Art, the college's first professor of art, Louise Jordan Smith, realized that while she couldn't take her students to New York, she could bring art to them. To this end, in 1911, Louise Jordan Smith established an annual exhibition of contemporary art on campus. Since then, the college's art collection has grown through acquisitions of artwork from the series of exhibitions, including works by Winslow Homer, Gilbert Stewart, Mary Cassatt, Milton Avery, Georgia O’Keeffe, Edward Hopper, Faith Ringgold, and Betye Saar.

Project Y 
In 1951, the National Gallery of Art established a secret emergency repository (code named "Project Y") for its distinguished collection of art on the campus of Randolph-Macon Woman's College (now Randolph College). The specially designed reinforced concrete building, situated at the end of Quinlan Street, was built for use in the event of national crisis during the Cold War. In exchange for ownership and use of the facility, the college made it available to the National Gallery for 50 years for emergency purposes. The A. W. Mellon Educational and Charitable Trust financed its construction. The structure was finished in the spring of 1952 costing under $250,000 to build and was simply called “the art gallery.” A pre-staged convoy of trucks in the National Gallery of Art's garage stood at the ready to evacuate its masterpieces to the facility which included a fully stocked, three-bedroom cottage for the gallery's curator.

In the mid-1970s, the college was granted permission by the National Gallery of Art to renovate the space to make it more practical, attractive and comfortable for the students, faculty and the public. The renovations were funded by the National Endowment for the Arts. After subsequent renovations in 1981-82 and the established of an endowment in 1983, funded by the Sarah and Pauline Maier Scholarship Foundation, the name was changed from “the art gallery” to its present name, the Maier Museum of Art.

Art controversies
In 2007, Randolph College announced that it would sell four paintings from its collection.  The announcement resulted in an injunction filed to stop the sales as well as protests from art associations, including the Virginia Association of Museums, the Association of Art Museum Directors and the College Art Association.  The lawsuit was dropped.

In 2008, the college sold Rufino Tamayo's Trovador for a record-breaking $7.2 million.  In 2013, Randolph College entered into an agreement with the National Gallery, London for the purchase of  George Wesley Bellows' Men of the Docks, for $25.5 million and established an academic partnership between the two institutions.  The other paintings sold at a later date are Edward Hicks' Peaceable Kingdom, and Ernest Hennings' Through the Arroyo (which remains on campus through a loan).

In the spring of 2011, Randolph College was censured by the Association of Art Museum Directors (AAMD), of which Randolph College is not nor has ever been a member, for its proposed deaccessioning of four centerpieces within its collection.   The college responded by asserting that its art collection is a college asset held for the purpose of enhancing student learning.  In 2014, the AAMD issued sanctions forbidding its member institutions from loaning artwork to or otherwise collaborating with the Maier Museum of Art at Randolph College.    The censure has sparked discussion over the differences between standalone museums and collections held by private non-profit entities like colleges and universities.

References

Museums in Lynchburg, Virginia
Randolph College
Art museums and galleries in Virginia